The V Corps, also known as Victory Corps, is a field corps of Pakistan Army assigned in Karachi, Sindh province of Pakistan. The V Corps is the only corps that is stationed in the Sindh Province, while the II Strike Corps and the IV Corps are both stationed in Punjab Province. It is headquartered in Karachi. Currently, the corps is commanded by Lieutenant-General Babar Iftikhar (Since December 2022).

History
The Corps was raised in 1975 to command Pakistani units in the entire of Sindh and some parts of southern Punjab and eastern Balochistan. The corps was heavily used in the Sindh anti-dacoity operations in the rural Sindh and the anti-terrorism operations in the urban Sindh during the late 1980s and the early 1990s. The Corps played an important role in 1999 coup d'état led by Chief of Army Staff and Chairman of Joint Chief of Staff Committee General Pervez Musharraf. The coup removed the democratically elected government of Prime minister Nawaz Sharif in 1999.

Structure

List of corps commanders

See also
XI Corps (Pakistan)
I Corps (Pakistan)
Structure of the Pakistan Army

References

External links
 Global Security Website about the V Corps
 This shows the Formations Insignia

5
Military units and formations established in 1975